Catacocha is a town in the Loja Province of Ecuador. It is the seat of the Paltas Canton.

References 
 www.inec.gov.ec

Populated places in Loja Province